Cougar Helicopters (a VIH Aviation Group Company) is a St. John's based commercial helicopter company servicing offshore oil and gas fields off the coast of Newfoundland. Cougar has permanent facilities in St. John's and Halifax. The company is affiliated with Bristow Helicopters which has a financial stake in Cougar.

Services

Cougar Helicopters currently services platforms and ships located off Newfoundland in the:
 Hibernia oil field 
 Terra Nova oil field
 White Rose oil field 
 Hebron-Ben Nevis oil field

Fleet
As of October 2020, Cougar Helicopters operates a fleet of ten Sikorsky S-92A and one Bell 412.

Incidents and accidents

On 12 March 2009, Cougar Helicopters Flight 91, a Cougar Sikorsky S-92A helicopter carrying 18 passengers and crew en route to an oil platform off the coast of Newfoundland, ditched and sank in 178 metres of water. 17 of the 18 people on board died in the crash.

References

External links

 Cougar Helicopters
 VIH Aviation Group

Regional airlines of Atlantic Canada
Helicopter airlines
Companies based in St. John's, Newfoundland and Labrador